Tanja Fajon (born May 9, 1971) is a Slovenian politician, leader of Social Democrats, part of the Party of European Socialists and former Member of the European Parliament (MEP) from Slovenia. She has served as the minister of foreign and european affairs in the government of Prime Minister Robert Golob since 1 June 2022.

She is a head of the Slovenian delegation within the political group of Progressive Alliance of Socialists and Democrats. She is also the author of several documentaries, including Rise of the extreme right in Europe, Human tragedies at the doorstep of Europe, and Constitution of European Union.

Education

Tanja Fajon graduated in journalism at the Faculty of Political and Social Sciences, University of Ljubljana. In 2005, she obtained a master's degree in Science and International Politics at the College of Interdisciplinary Studies, University of Paris.

Tanja Fajon speaks Slovenian, English, German, French, and Croatian.

Career

Career in journalism

Tanja Fajon worked as a journalist and assistant editor at Radio Glas Ljubljana from 1991 to 1995. She was also a reporter and a writer for the Slovenian daily newspaper Republika in 1993. She worked for RTV Slovenia from 1995 to 2001 as a local journalist, and as a correspondent for RTV Slovenia in Brussels from 2001 to 2009. She was also a reporter for CNN from 1995 to 2001. She covered issues from politics, to economy and business, in different States of the European Union, particularly in Belgium, the Netherlands, Luxembourg, and France.

Member of the European Parliament, 2009–2022

In 2009, Fajon was elected to the European Parliament on behalf of the Social Democrats, associated with the Progressive Alliance of Socialists and Democrats. She was a vice chairwoman of the European Parliament delegation with Croatia until Croatia's membership in the European Union, and a member of the Committee on Organised Crime, Corruption and Money Laundering.

Fajon is a full member of the Committee on Civil Liberties, Justice and Home Affairs, a substitute member in the Committee on Transport and Tourism, and a substitute member of the European Union-United States delegation. She also serves as a substitute member of the Delegation for relations with Albania, Bosnia and Herzegovina, Serbia, Montenegro and Kosovo, and was a rapporteur on the visa liberalisation process for the Western Balkans.

In addition to her committee assignments, Fajon is a vice chairwoman of the European Parliament Intergroup on Media, responsible for monitoring freedom of the press in Europe. She is also a member of the European Parliament Intergroup on Integrity (Transparency, Anti-Corruption and Organised Crime); of the European Parliament Intergroup on LGBT Rights; and the MEPs Against Cancer group.

Fajon contributed greatly to the Albanian citizens getting the right to freely travel in EU Schengen Area without visas. This is the first step on Albania's path to European Union accession. In December 2010, a café named after Tanja Fajon was opened in her honor in Tirana, the capital of Albania. She helped Bosnia and Herzegovina, and Moldova gain freedom of Schengen movement as well.

In late 2014, the two main political groups in the European Parliament agreed with Jean-Claude Juncker, then president-elect of the European Commission, that Fajon should be Slovenia's member of the European Commission. However, the Slovenian government later announced that Violeta Bulc was going to be the country's nominee for the position of the European Commissioner on the Juncker Commission, replacing Alenka Bratušek.

In 2016, Slovenian opinion polls showed her to be one of the most popular political figures in the country.

Following the 2019 elections, Fajon was part of a cross-party working group in charge of drafting the European Parliament's five-year work program on the rule of law, borders and migration.

Following months of protests and the announcement of a boycott of the 2020 Serbian parliamentary election by opposition parties, Fajon has been one of the key figures in EP-mediated interparty dialogue, as the chair of the delegation for relations with Serbia.

Other activities

 European Council on Foreign Relations (ECFR), Member
 Friends of Europe, Member of the Board of Trustees

Personal life
Fajon lives mostly in Brussels with her husband Veit-Ulrich Braun, a German journalist. Her hobbies are sports, music, and traveling.

Honors and awards

: Tanja Fajon was named Person of the Year 2009 in Bosnia and Herzegovina, for her endeavors to abolish visa requirements for the Western Balkan citizens.
: On October 22, 2010, Tanja Fajon received a copy of the key of the city of Tirana, on the occasion of state visit to Albania.
: In December 2010, Tanja Fajon was the first to receive an honorary doctorate from the American University in Bosnia and Herzegovina in Sarajevo.
: In May 2014, Tanja Fajon received a Key of Heart from citizens of Bosnia and Herzegovina in Sarajevo.
: On September 10, 2019, Tanja Fajon received "Award for the Contribution to the European Integration of the Region" by portal European Western Balkans for "her unwavering commitment to the European future of the Western Balkans (WB) amidst rising challenges, continued representation of the value-based EU in the region, as well as the principled promotion of democracy, freedom and tolerance”Award for the Contribution to the European Integration of the Region".

References

External links

1971 births
Living people
Politicians from Ljubljana
University of Ljubljana alumni
Journalists from Ljubljana
Social Democrats (Slovenia) MEPs
MEPs for Slovenia 2009–2014
Women MEPs for Slovenia
MEPs for Slovenia 2014–2019
MEPs for Slovenia 2019–2024
Deputy Prime Ministers of Slovenia
Foreign ministers of Slovenia
Female foreign ministers
Women government ministers of Slovenia